The Rural Municipality of Rosthern No. 403 is a rural municipality (RM) in the Canadian province of Saskatchewan within Census Division No. 15 and  Division No. 5. It is located in the central portion of the province north of the City of Saskatoon.

History 
The RM of Rosthern No. 403 incorporated as a rural municipality on December 9, 1912.

Demographics 

Geography

Communities and localities 
The following urban municipalities are surrounded by the RM.

Towns
 Rosthern
 Hague

The following unincorporated communities are within the RM.

Organized hamlets
 Blumenthal
 Neuanlage

Localities
 Arma
 Carlton
 Chortitz
 Gruenthal
 Hochstadt
 Schoenweise

Attractions 
 Carlton Trail
 Eigenheim Mennonite Church
 Fort Carlton
 Hague Ferry
 Mennonite Heritage Museum
 Saskatchewan River Valley Museum
 Seager Wheeler's Maple Grove Farm
 Valley Regional Park (Rosthern)

Government 
The RM of Rosthern No. 403 is governed by an elected municipal council and an appointed administrator that meets on the second Tuesday of every month. The reeve of the RM is Martin Penner while its administrator is Amanda McCormick. The RM's office is located in Rosthern.

See also 
List of rural municipalities in Saskatchewan

References

External links 

Rosthern
Division No. 15, Saskatchewan